The Nissan C-series was an inline-four automobile engine produced in the 1950s and into the 1960s. It displaced 1.0 L (988 cc) and produced 37 hp (27.6 kW) and 47.7 to 49 lb·ft (64.7 to 66.4 Nm).  It was a pushrod engine and used single or dual-26 mm carburetors.

The C engine was derived from the 1.5 L Nissan 1H (1489 cc) engine, itself being a licensed built version of the 1.5 BMC B-Series engine that featured a 73 mm bore x 89 mm stroke. To create the C engine, Nissan under the advice of American engineer Donald Stone (formerly of Willys-Overland) followed his suggestion of de-stroking the 1.5 engine from 89 mm to 59 mm, with the resulting C1 engine being called the "Stone engine" in his honor. When it was later increased to 1.2 L via an increased stroke from 59 mm to 71mm, it was called the Nissan E engine. 

The Nissan C engine would go on to be directly replaced by the Nissan A engine in the 1967 Nissan Sunny B10, whose 1-litre A10 unit shared virtually the same displacement and same 73mm bore x 59mm stroke as the C engine.   

Applications:
 1957-1959 Datsun 210/211
 1957-1960 Datsun 220/221/222 Truck
 1959-1960 Datsun S211
 1959.08-1963 Datsun Bluebird 310
 1963.09-1964.09 Datsun Bluebird 410

See also
 List of Nissan engines

References

C
Gasoline engines by model
Straight-four engines